Year 971 (CMLXXI) was a common year starting on Sunday (link will display the full calendar) of the Julian calendar.

Events 
 By place 

 Byzantine Empire 
 Battle of Dorostolon: A Byzantine expeditionary army (possibly 30–40,000 men) attacks the Bulgarian frontier, personally led by Emperor John I. He lays siege to the fortress city of Dorostolon (located on the Lower Danube), and is reinforced by a fleet of 300 ships equipped with Greek fire. The Kievan Rus' and their Bulgarian allies are reduced to extremities by famine. After a 3-month siege, Grand Prince Sviatoslav I agrees to sign a peace treaty with the Byzantines, whereby he renounces his interests towards Bulgarian lands and the city of Chersonesos in Crimea. Sviatoslav is allowed to evacuate his army to Berezan Island, while the Byzantines enter Dorostolon. John renames the city Theodoropolis (named after the reigning Empress Theodora).
 John I returns in triumph to Constantinople. He brings along Boris II, ruler (tsar) of the Bulgarian Empire, and his family, together with the contents of the Bulgarian imperial treasury. Boris is given the Byzantine 'court title' of magistros as compensation. The Bulgarian lands in Thrace and Lower Moesia become part of the Byzantine Empire.

 Europe 
 Otto I 'the Great', Holy Roman Emperor, appoints his imperial secretary Willigis as chancellor (guardian of the emperor's seal), an office formerly held by Otto's brother, Archbishop Bruno I.

 Britain 
 King Cuilén (or Cuilean) is killed by Britons after a 6-year reign. He is succeeded by his nephew Kenneth II, as ruler of Alba (Scotland). He will not be sole king until 977.

 Africa 
 Battle of Alexandretta: The Byzantines defeat a Fatimid force (4,000 men) near Alexandretta (modern Turkey), while the main Fatimid army is besieging the fortress city of Antioch. Coupled with news of an advance against Damascus of the Qarmatians, the Fatimids are forced to lift the siege and withdraw to Egypt.

 Asia 
 Emperor Aditya Chola II, co-regent of the Chola dynasty (modern India), is murdered and succeeded by Uttama. Due to his immaturity, Arunmozhi Varman becomes the heir apparent.

 China 
 January 23 – A war elephant corps of the Southern Han is defeated at Shao, by crossbow fire from Song dynasty troops. The Southern Han Kingdom is forced to submit to the Song dynasty. Ending Southern Han rule, but also the first regular war elephant corps employed in a Chinese army, that had gained the Southern Han victories throughout the 10th century.

 By topic 

 Religion 
 The grave of Swithun, Anglo-Saxon bishop of Winchester, is moved into an indoor shrine (he was previously buried outside) in the Old Minster. The ceremony is said to have been marred by 40 days of torrential rain.

Births   
 Kushyar Gilani, Persian mathematician and geographer (d. 1029)
 Mahmud of Ghazni, emir of the Ghaznavid Empire (d. 1030)
 Oliba, Spanish count and bishop (approximate date)
 Rajendra Chola, Emperor of Chola Dynasty at its peak

Deaths 
 Aditya Chola II, prince and ruler of the Chola dynasty (India)
 Abū Ja'far al-Khāzin, Persian astronomer (b. 900)
 Anemas, Byzantine (Muslim) army commander
 Atto, bishop of Vic (Spain) (approximate date)
 Cuilén (or Cuilean), king of Alba (Scotland)
 Eraclus (or Evraclus), bishop of Liège
 Ja'far ibn Fallah, Fatimid general and governor
 Kalokyros, Byzantine patrician and pretender
 Li Jingda, prince of Southern Tang (b. 924)
 Muhammad al-Khushani, Umayyad historian 
 Muhammad ibn Rumahis, Umayyad admiral 
 Ordgar, English ealdorman and advisor
 Qian Hongzong, king of Wuyue (approximate date)
 Ziri ibn Manad, founder of the Zirid dynasty

References